The Goonies is  a 1985 film produced by Steven Spielberg.

Goonies may also refer to:

The Goonies: Original Motion Picture Soundtrack, the soundtrack to the film
The Goonies (Famicom video game), a video game for the Family Computer
The Goonies (MSX video game), a video game for MSX home computers
The Goonies (1985 video game), a 1985 video game by Datasoft
San Jose Earthquakes, an American professional soccer team based in San Jose, California, USA; which carried the nickname "The Goonies"

See also

Albatross or goonie birds, a family of birds
 
Goon (disambiguation)
Gooney (disambiguation)